Felissa Rose Esposito, better known as simply Felissa Rose (born May 23, 1969), is an American actress and producer. Rose has amassed over 100 film credits, and is best known for her work in the horror genre, for which she is recognized as a scream queen.

Rose made her film debut as Angela Baker in the cult horror film Sleepaway Camp (1983), which established her as a horror icon. She reprised the role in the 2008 sequel Return to Sleepaway Camp. Her other horror roles include Elsa Lansing in Silent Night, Zombie Night (2009), Mother in The Perfect House (2012), Rachel Steele in Camp Dread (2014), Angela Freeman in Death House (2018), Kathleen in Victor Crowley (2018), Ms. Crowell in Bloody Summer Camp (2022) and Ms. Principe in Terrifier 2 (2022).

In 2016, Rose produced a number of music videos for the metal band Slayer.

Early life
Born in Greenwich Village in New York City, Rose grew up in Woodbury, New York. Rose graduated from New York University.

Career
Rose made her debut film appearance in the 1983 horror film Sleepaway Camp, in which she plays Angela Baker. She later said of the film, "It was such a big part of my childhood. It's really hard to look at it objectively. On opening night I went to the theater with all my friends and watched it for the first time with a public audience. It was the best feeling. The energy in the theater was intense. People were really freaked out by the ending. I felt really good about the film."

After appearing in Sleepaway Camp, she made some more sporadic appearances in a few films and television series, including the 1993 romantic comedy film The Night We Never Met and an episode of the short-lived 1998 television series Prey. In 1999, she was contacted by Jeff Hayes, who operates the official Sleepaway Camp website, via a letter in the mail asking her to do an interview for the website and gauge her interest in doing a new Sleepaway Camp sequel. Shortly thereafter, Hayes met with Rose in New York.

She has since returned to cinema and has appeared in such films as Zombiegeddon (2003), Nikos (2003), and Sludge (2005). She has also appeared in two films by New Jersey filmmaker Dante Tomaselli: Horror (2002) and Satan's Playground (2005). In addition Felissa co-hosted the 2005 Village Halloween Parade in New York City with fellow scream queens Debbie Rochon and Raine Brown. She also had a cameo role in the sequel to the 2008 Sleepaway Camp sequel Return to Sleepaway Camp. In the sequel, she reprises the role of Angela Baker. The movie had a straight to DVD release on November 4, 2008. She also appears in Hotdog Casserole, written and directed by Chris Raab, as the mother in a dysfunctional family. Rose starred in a role as Mother in the segment "Dinner Guest" in the anthology horror film, The Perfect House. She also portrayed forensic pathologist Amy Short in the thriller Poe.

In 2016, Felissa starred in the paranormal horror film Family Possessions, written and directed by Tommy Faircloth. The film also starred Mark Patton. In May 2017, she helped produce and acted in the horror film Death House. That same year, she appeared in Victor Crowley. In November 2022, Rose worked with Shelley Duvall on the film The Forest Hills.

Personal life
Rose lives in California with her husband, former CKY singer/guitarist Deron Miller, and their two daughters, Bianca Rose (born 2005) and Lola Marue (born 2007), and son Thomas Carver (born 2009). Rose and Miller were co-stars in Dave Campfield's 2008 horror comedy Caesar and Otto's Summer Camp Massacre.

Partial filmography

Film

Television

References

External links

1969 births
American film actresses
Living people
People from Greenwich Village
American people of Italian descent
Tisch School of the Arts alumni
People from Woodbury, Nassau County, New York